TR4 may refer to:

 Socket TR4, a CPU socket for AMD processors
 TR4, Tomb Raider: The Last Revelation, the fourth video game in the Tomb Raider series
 TR4, a postal district in the TR postcode area
 TR4, the cow-calf version of the EMD SW7 diesel locomotive
 TR.4, a  Canadian turbojet engine
 The TR-4, musician group that recorded with Tommy Rettig
 Travan TR-4, the fourth generation of the Travan mass storage magnetic tape computer backup cartridge
 Triumph TR4, a British sports car
 Fusarium oxysporum f.sp. cubense § Tropical Race 4, a disease of banana plants

See also

 
 
 TR (disambiguation)